La Isla is one of 13 parishes (administrative divisions) in the Colunga municipality, within the province and autonomous community of Asturias, in northern Spain.

The population is 188 (INE 2007).

References

Parishes in Colunga